The Estonian Contingencies were the joint military operations of the Estonian Defence Forces deployed in numerous countries in NATO/UN Peacekeeping missions.

1990-1999 

 Bosnia and Herzegovina (1995-2004)
 Implementation Force (1995-1996), 1 year joint military peacekeeping enforcement led by NATO during the Bosnian War in the Yugoslav Wars.
 Stabilization Force in Bosnia and Herzegovina (1995-2004), Joint military peacekeeping mission led by NATO after the Bosnian War.
 UNIFIL (1996-1997), UN peacekeeping mission to monitor hostilities in Lebanon, Estonia contributed one staff officer.

2000-2009 

 Estonian Iraqi Contingent (2003-2008), Joint military force of the Estonian Defence Forces deployed in Iraq during the Iraq War mostly in the Baghdad Governorate in the Sab-al-Bori area.
 Estonian Afghanistan Contingent (2003-2008), Joint military force of the Estonian Defence Forces deployed in Afghanistan during the War In Afghanistan. The units are under the allegiance of the International Security Assistance Force (ISAF)
 Estonian Kosovo Contingent (Alternatively 'Kosovo Contingent')(2003–present), joint military force of the Estonian Defence Forces deployed in Kosovo during Operation Joint Interprise (Commonly "Kosovo Force")

2010-2019 

 Mali (2013–present)
 Operation Barkhane (2018–present), anti-insurgent operation led by France against Islamic extremism, Estonia has provided ~90 soldiers of mechanized and Special forces units.
 EUTM Mali (2013–present), operation to better train the Malian Armed Forces led by the European Union, Estonia has contributed 2 staff officers and a training team.
 MINUSMA Mali (2013–present), UN Peacekeeping mission that strengthens stabilization in the area, Estonia has contributed two staff officers and an analyst.
 EUNAVFOR (2015–present), operation ran by the European Union to search ships for potential human trafficking, Estonia has contributed a logistics officer in the HQ in Rome, Italy.

2020-present 
 Wisent (2021–present), a Polish-Estonian joint operation. 
 Wisent 1 (December 2021), Estonian military unit, with around 70 troops, arrived in Poland, the unit and the 18th Infantry Division of Poland helped clean up and block/defend the border area due to the Belarusian border crisis.
 Wisent 3 (February 2022), The joint operation had continued with 60 troops which built barriers on the border, and built around 40 km of border protection due to de-escalation of tensions in Ukraine.
 Wisent 4 (April 2022), The Estonian and Polish troops concluded deployment with ceremony for Katyn victims.
 Wisent 5 (April 2022), The joint-operative troops made 4 bridges, and the Polish guard started to patrol the border, and the group have improved road infrastructure along around 10 km of the road.

References 

Contingencies
United Nations-related lists
NATO-related lists
United Nations peacekeeping